Trifurcula immundella, the broom pygmy moth,  is a moth of the family Nepticulidae. It is found in western Europe, wherever the host plant occurs.

The wingspan is 6–8.4 mm. The thick erect hairs on the head vertex are ferruginous-yellowish, sometimes mixed with fuscous. The collar is rust brown. Antennal eyecaps are whitish. The forewings are ochreous-grey-whitish, coarsely irrorated with fuscous. Hindwings grey. External image

Adults are on wing from June to August.

The larvae feed on Cytisus scoparius. They mine the bark of twigs of their host plant. The mine consists of a dark gallery, which is similar to the mine of Leucoptera spartifoliella.

References

External links
Fauna Europaea
UKmoths
Swedish Moths
 Figures of genitalia
lepiforum.de

Nepticulidae
Moths of Europe
Moths described in 1839